Kiz Bridge is a historical bridge near the Mianeh in East Azerbaijan.

The age of the bridge is unknown, some archaeologists date it to the Sassanid era while other attribute to as being 8th century AD Muslim era construct. The bridge is constructed of three arches with the center arch narrower than the respective side arches.

The bridge was partly destroyed in December 1946 by communist separatists of the "Democrat Party of Azerbaijan" in a futile attempt to halt the advance of the Imperial Iranian Army.

References

 
 

Meyaneh County
Bridges in Iran
Buildings and structures in East Azerbaijan Province